The Fluminense Republican Party (PRF) was a Brazilian political party founded in 1888 to represent the republican ideals of the agrarian elite of Rio de Janeiro. Its principal representative was the Florianist Nilo Peçanha, President of the Republic from 1909 to 1910. The moderate wing, led by governor and senator José Thomaz da Porciúncula, and linked to the São Paulo directorate was hostile to Florianism and did not support him.

In common with all of the parties of the República Velha the PRF was abolished shortly after the inauguration of the Estado Novo by Decree-Law No. 37, 2 December 1937.

First Brazilian Republic
Defunct political parties in Brazil
Political parties established in 1888
Conservative parties in Brazil
Republican parties
Political parties disestablished in 1937
1888 establishments in Brazil
1937 disestablishments in Brazil